Anne Kendrick Benedict (April 26, 1851 – ?) was an American author of children's literature focusing on scientific topics, such as physiology, and an author of religious periodicals. Benedict was born in Rochester, New York and graduated the Elmira Female College in Elmira, New York, obtaining a B.A in 1870. Benedict married Wayland Benedict in 1873 and then moved to Cincinnati between July 1875 and December 1878. While in New York and Cincinnati, Benedict had five children (three girls and two boys).

Early life and education 
Anne Kendrick Benedict was born to Asahel Clark and Anne Elizabeth (Hopkins) Kendrick in Rochester, New York. Anne Kendrick has one known sister, Florence. At the age of 15, Anne Kendrick attended Elmira College, beginning in 1866 and graduating in 1870 earning a B.A. At her graduation, Anne Kendrick gave a commencement speech entitled "Demosthenes and St. Paul."

Family life 
Soon after marrying Wayland Benedict in 1873, Anne Kendrick and Wayland gave birth to their first child Mary K. Benedict in July 1875 in New York. Soon after giving brith to Mary K., Anne Kendrick's family moved to Cincinnati, Ohio. In Cincinnati, Anne Kendrick gave birth to four more children: Howard Benedict (b. December 1878), Florence L. Benedict (b. January 1881), Stanley R. Benedict (March 17, 1884 – December 21, 1936), and Agnes E. Benedict (b. October 1888). Stanley R. Benedict later became a chemist, having earned a B.S. from the University of Cincinnati, and discovered the Benedict's reagent. Also while in Cincinnati, the Benedict family had a servant named Jessie Taylor (b. July 1879). She attended what is now the Morning Star Baptist Church while living in Cincinnati.

Publications 
Anne Kendrick Benedict was a writer of children's science and religious literature. Her most famous story, My Wonder-Story, was published by the Lothrop Company in 1888 and is about a mother who explores the anatomy and physiology of the human body with her children Jack and Florence. Another of her more popular publications includes The Hathaways' Sister, "a girl's [baptist] book about girls who are not unnaturally good nor bad." Some of her other works include Centa, The Child Violinist, The Island Story, The Fisherman's Daughter, The Enchanted Deer, The Home Circle (Published April 18, 1883), and How We Are Made (Published April 11, 1883).

References 

1851 births
Year of death missing
19th-century American women writers
Writers from Cincinnati
American women children's writers
American children's writers
Elmira College alumni
Writers from Rochester, New York